Southern Christian College is a college in Midsayap, Cotabato, Philippines.

History 

Southern Christian College has its story of origin, the people or circumstances that launched it, and who's who managed its course thereafter. Through evolutionary development — the original concept of SCC as a Protestant school was shaped and reshaped into an organic collection of traditions and distinctive ways. Rev. Proculo Rodriguez of Siliman University visited Midsayap in 1937. He met Mr. Bibiano Quiñones and Mr. and Mrs. Fernando dela Serna and they struck the spark of putting up a Protestant school in Mindanao. The idea was nurtured; however, the dream did not come true even though Maguindanao Institute was opened in June 1941. Maguindanao Institute was registered as non-sectarian, a stock corporation with 37 stockholders. Mr. Quiñones, with more than half of the shares of stock of Maguindanao Institute, offered to donate his shares of stock to the new school. This kind of gesture was influential in the decision of choosing Midsayap as the site of Southern Christian College.

The Cotabato and Davao Conferences bought the present site from the stockholders of the defunct Maguindanao Institute that dissolved itself and paved the way for the new Christian school, Southern Christian College (SCC). The members of the women's organization of both conferences raised initial contribution, cash or in-kind, to start the school's operation. SCC was established as a non-stock, non-profit religious educational institution in 1949. It was registered with the Securities and Exchange Commission as an educational arm of United Church of Christ in the Philippines. the original incorporators, who also composed the first Board of Trustees, were: Atty. Florentino L. Martinez, Mr. Claudio P. Fajardo, Rev. Elton Brown, Mr. Clemente Dimafeliz, Dr. Samuel Royola, Rev. Manuel J. Villanueva, Mr. Fernando dela Cerna, Mr. Bibiano Quiñones, Mr. Juan Cruzado, and Mr. Emilio Albarico.

Since its foundation, Church Workers, either layperson or minister has administered Southern Christian College. Atty. Florentino L. Martinez served the SCC in 1949 to the 1950; Rev. Angel J. Alvaro, 1950–53; Prof. Guillermo Magdamo, 1953-1960; Bishop Proculo ROdriguez; 1960–63; Dr. Eliezer D. Mapanao (1965-1987); Dr. Filemon L. Lagon (1987-1994); Dr. Eliezer D. Mapanao (1994-1997); and Dr. Erlinda N. Senturias (1997- May 31, 2007).

Dr. Senturias was SCC's first Woman College President and her servant leadership was guided with the mission that “SCC commits itself to the education of persons to understand and live God´s will in all areas in life.” The principles includes quality education that is contextualized, liberating, empowering, relevant, people as subjects of education, responsive to the needs of people, faith-rooted and grounded ecumenical, and critical and analytical processes.

SCC embarked on auxiliary programs that will provide financial under girding to continue SCC's vision-mission in education. The SCC Feedmill that seeks to provide accessible, available and affordable livestock, feeds, was started by Rev. John Beran, a fraternal worker from the united Presbyterian Church in the USA. It was recently registered as Saranay Feeds, Product of SCC, Pride of Cotabato.

The future of SCC lies in the purpose of God, the dedication and devotion of the newly installed President of the College, the Rev. Dr. Melanio L. Aoanan.

Dr. Aoanan is a minister of the United Church of Christ in the Philippines, an author, researcher and professor of philosophy, ethics, religion, and theology. He taught in several colleges and universities such as Silliman University, Philippine Christian University, De La Salle University, and Union Theological Seminary.

Dr. Aoanan is not new to Southern Christian Colleges. He had spent thirteen prolific years at the College where he was a Director of Religious Studies from 1973 to 1975; Chaplain and Dean of the College of Theology from 1982 to 1988; and an Executive officer for Spiritual Life and values Formation from 1988 to 1995. As new leader of SCC, he campaigns for the continuity of the previous leadership's plan of pursuing for the university status for the college; for the generation of enough resources to support the Colleges program through the establishment of endowed professional chairs; for the strengthening of relationship and linkages with other academics institutions and partner organizations; for the pursuit of the teaching faculty to engage in the complete postgraduate studies; for the promotion of a culture of research and publications for both teaching and nonteaching personnel ; for the implementation of strategies for an aggressive student recruitment; and for taping the goodwill and support of thousands of alumni and friends of the College.

References

External links
 http://southernchristiancollege.edu.ph

Universities and colleges in Cotabato